Robert Ritchie (born February 20, 1955) is a Canadian former professional ice hockey left winger who played 29 National Hockey League (NHL) games with the Philadelphia Flyers and Detroit Red Wings during the 1976–77 and 1977–78 seasons.

Career statistics

Regular season and playoffs

External links
 

1955 births
Living people
Anglophone Quebec people
Canadian ice hockey left wingers
Detroit Red Wings players
Ice hockey people from Quebec
Kansas City Red Wings players
People from Abitibi-Témiscamingue
Philadelphia Flyers draft picks
Philadelphia Flyers players
Richmond Robins players
Sorel Éperviers players
Springfield Indians players
Toronto Toros draft picks